Callicarpa cathayana is a species of beautyberry. It is grown in gardens and parks as an ornamental plant for its decorative pink flowers and berries. The purple berries are a drupe. They are not edible for humans. Birds eat the berries and disperse the seeds. The species are endangered in the wild. Callicarpa cathayana is native to China.

External links

 Callicarpa cathayana Picture

cathayana
Endemic flora of China
Plants described in 1951